Katyn may refer to:

Katyn massacre, a mass execution of Polish generals, military commanders and intelligentsia in 1940
Katyń (film), a 2007 Polish film about the Katyń massacre directed by Andrzej Wajda
Katyn (rural locality), a selo in Smolensk Oblast, Russia, and the site of the Katyn massacre
Katyń Memorial (Jersey City), Jersey City, New Jersey, dedicated to the victims of the Katyn massacre
Katyn war cemetery, a Polish military cemetery in the village of Katyn, Smolensk Oblast, Russia
National Katyń Memorial, Baltimore, Maryland, dedicated to the victims of the Katyn massacre

See also
Khatyn, a village in Belarus, in Lahojsk district, Minsk Voblast, whose population was massacred in 1943